Siniša Ubiparipović (born 25 August 1983) is a retired  Bosnian-born American footballer.

Early life
Ubiparipović was born in the town of Zenica, at the time part of SR Bosnia and Herzegovina, SFR Yugoslavia, to an ethnic Serb family. Prior to the outbreak of the Bosnian War in 1992, the Ubiparipović family moved to Belgrade, the capital of Serbia, to escape the conflict, eventually coming to the United States in 1999.

His first contact with organized soccer was in the youth ranks of Čelik Zenica as a small child.

Career

College
Ubiparipović began his college soccer career at the University of Illinois at Chicago in 2002, before transferring to the University of Akron, where he played from 2004 to 2006. At Akron, he was named an NSCAA All-American his last two years, and was the 2006 Mid-American Conference Player of the Year. During his college years Ubiparipović also played in the USL Premier Development League for both Cleveland Internationals and Chicago Fire Premier. While with the Chicago Fire Premier he was named to the Premier Development League's All-Central Conference team.

Professional

Ubiparipović was drafted in the third round (33rd overall) of the 2007 MLS SuperDraft by New York Red Bulls. During his initial campaign with New York he appeared in 12 regular season matches and both of the club's playoff matches. He was also loaned out for one match during the 2007 season to Minnesota Thunder of the USL First Division, tallying one goal in a 4–2 loss to Rochester Rhinos.

During the 2008 season Ubiparipović appeared in 16 regular season matches and scored his first league goal. On 10 August 2008, Ubiparipović scored the fourth goal in New York's 4–1 victory over league rival D.C. United. During the 2008 MLS Cup Playoffs, he started all of the team's 4 playoff games helping lead the club to the 2008 MLS Cup final. In the 2009 season Siniša made a career-high 23 appearances for Red Bulls.
On 20 March 2010, Ubiparipović started at left wing for Red Bulls in a 3–1 victory against Santos FC, which was the first match played at the new Red Bull Arena. On 12 May 2010 Ubiparipović scored his second goal for New York Red Bulls in a 3–0 victory over New England Revolution in a 2010 Lamar Hunt U.S. Open Cup qualification match.

His contract expired with New York Red Bulls after the 2010 season and he became a free agent. On 2 August 2011 Ubiparipović signed with Montreal Impact of the North American Soccer League. In 10 games with Montreal, Ubiparipović registered three goals and four assists, and was recognized as the club's newcomer of the year. On 1 November 2011, it was announced that Ubiparipović re-signed to continue with the Impact in 2012, the team's first year in Major League Soccer.

On 6 February 2014, Ubiparipović signed with Ottawa Fury FC of the NASL. He was a key player in helping Ottawa to the 2015 NASL fall season title as he scored 5 goals and recorded 8 assists in 26 matches. He later signed with Indy Eleven on December 15, 2015.

On 20 September 2017, Ubiparipović announced that he would retire from football at the end of the 2017 season.

Personal
Siniša's brother Slaviša Ubiparipović played for Cleveland Internationals in the USL Premier Development League in 2008 and currently plays for the San Diego Sockers in the MASL.

Career statistics

Club

Honors

New York Red Bulls
Major League Soccer Western Conference Championship (1): 2008

Montreal Impact
Canadian Championship (1): 2013

Ottawa Fury
 NASL Fall Championship 2015

Indy Eleven 
 NASL Spring Championship 2016

References

External links

Montreal Impact player profile
Interview for klix.ba

1983 births
Living people
Sportspeople from Zenica
Serbs of Bosnia and Herzegovina
Bosnia and Herzegovina emigrants to the United States
American people of Serbian descent
Association football midfielders
Bosnia and Herzegovina footballers
UIC Flames men's soccer players
Akron Zips men's soccer players
Cleveland Internationals players
Chicago Fire U-23 players
New York Red Bulls draft picks
New York Red Bulls players
Minnesota Thunder players
Montreal Impact (1992–2011) players
CF Montréal players
Minnesota United FC (2010–2016) players
Ottawa Fury FC players
Indy Eleven players
USL League Two players
USL First Division players
Major League Soccer players
North American Soccer League players
Bosnia and Herzegovina expatriate footballers
Expatriate soccer players in the United States
Bosnia and Herzegovina expatriate sportspeople in the United States
Expatriate soccer players in Canada
Bosnia and Herzegovina expatriate sportspeople in Canada
Bosnia and Herzegovina football managers
Cleveland State Vikings men's soccer coaches
Bosnia and Herzegovina expatriate football managers
Expatriate soccer managers in the United States